Catabena lineolata, the fine-lined sallow, is a species of moth in the family Noctuidae (the owlet moths). It is found in North America.

The MONA or Hodges number for Catabena lineolata is 10033.

References

Further reading

 
 
 

Noctuidae
Articles created by Qbugbot
Moths described in 1865